Gendi Khori may refer to:
 Gendi Khori-ye Olya
 Gendi Khori-ye Sofla
 Gendi Khori-ye Vosta